Rodney W. "Rod" Hamilton (born March 25, 1968) is a Minnesota politician and former member of the Minnesota House of Representatives. A member of the Republican Party of Minnesota, he represented District 22B, which includes all or portions of Cottonwood, Jackson, Nobles and Redwood counties in the southwestern part of the state. He is also a local pork producer.

Early life, education, and career
Hamilton graduated from Humboldt High School in Humboldt, Iowa. He is a former president of the Minnesota Pork Producers.

Minnesota House of Representatives
Hamilton was first elected to the House in 2004, and was re-elected in 2006, 2008, 2010, 2012, 2014, 2016 and 2018. He was a minority whip during the 2009 legislative session, and was an assistant minority leader during the 2010 session.

On November 17, 2010, incoming Republican Speaker of the House Kurt Zellers announced that Hamilton would serve as chairman of the House Agriculture Committee during the 2011–2012 biennium. On November 30, 2010, he was named majority whip by his House Republican colleagues.

In 2014, he was again elected to the Minnesota House of Representatives. Rep. Rod Hamilton, R-Mountain Lake, will chair the House Agriculture Finance Committee.

References

External links

 Rep. Rod Hamilton official Minnesota House of Representatives website
 Minnesota Public Radio Votetracker: Rep. Rod Hamilton
 Project Votesmart - Rep. Rod Hamilton Profile
 Rep. Rod Hamilton official campaign website
 

1968 births
Living people
People from Mountain Lake, Minnesota
Republican Party members of the Minnesota House of Representatives
American Lutherans
People from Humboldt, Iowa
21st-century American politicians